The 2008–09 UCI Oceania Tour was the fifth season of the UCI Oceania Tour. The season began on 12 October 2008 with the Herald Sun Tour and ended on 15 February 2009 with the Oceania Cycling Championships.

The points leader, based on the cumulative results of previous races, wears the UCI Oceania Tour cycling jersey. Hayden Roulston of New Zealand was the defending champion of the 2007–08 UCI Oceania Tour. Peter McDonald of Australia was crowned as the 2008–09 UCI Oceania Tour champion.

Throughout the season, points are awarded to the top finishers of stages within stage races and the final general classification standings of each of the stages races and one-day events. The quality and complexity of a race also determines how many points are awarded to the top finishers, the higher the UCI rating of a race, the more points are awarded.
The UCI ratings from highest to lowest are as follows:
 Multi-day events: 2.HC, 2.1 and 2.2
 One-day events: 1.HC, 1.1 and 1.2

Events

2008

2009

Final standings

Individual classification

Team classification

Nation classification

Nation under-23 classification

External links
 

UCI Oceania Tour

2009 in Oceanian sport
2008 in Oceanian sport